David Álvarez Flores (1900 – 20 July 1940) was a Spanish engraver. Flores supported the Second Spanish Republic during the Spanish Civil War. After the Nationalist victory, Flores was executed by the government of Francisco Franco in Madrid.

Biography
David Álvarez Flores was born in Madrir and grew up in Tolosa where he began his career as a cartoonist.

References

External links
 Retratos desde la prisión, diariovasco.com, 26 de enero de 2011.
 Retratos desde la prisión. Dibujos de Pedro Antequera y David Álvarez, hoyesarte.com.
 Caricaturas entre rejas, El País, 26 de enero de 2011.
 El legado de David Álvarez, diariovasco.com, 20 de enero de 2010.

1900 births
1940 deaths
Spanish military personnel of the Spanish Civil War (Republican faction)
People executed by Francoist Spain
20th-century engravers